Sergey Malyshev may refer to:

Sergey Malyshev (sport shooter), Russian sport shooter
Sergey Malyshev (ice skater), Russian ice skater